Lynne Walker may refer to:

Lynne Walker (critic) (1956–2011), Scottish-born music and theatre critic
Lynne Walker (politician) (born 1962), Australian politician in the Northern Territory